= Pyrindus =

Town of ancient Caria

Pyrindus or Pyrindos (Πύρινδος) was a town of ancient Caria, cited by Stephanus of Byzantium. It was a polis (city-state).

Its site is unlocated.
